Aaron Stell (March 26, 1911 – January 7, 1996, in Los Angeles) was an American film editor with one hundred feature film credits and many additional credits for his television work. Stell worked for more than a decade at the start of his career at Columbia Pictures (1943–1955 credits), which was a major Hollywood studio in that era. Among his most noted films are Touch of Evil (directed by Orson Welles-1958), To Kill a Mockingbird (directed by Robert Mulligan-1962), and Silent Running (directed by Douglas Trumbull-1972).

Touch of Evil, which was directed by Orson Welles, proved difficult for Stell; he was not the initial editor but instead chosen for re-editing, and he noted that Welles became "ill, depressed, and unhappy with the studio's impatience" in the process.

Stell had been selected as a member of the American Cinema Editors. He was nominated for the American Cinema Editors Eddie award for To Kill a Mockingbird (1962). He was also nominated for Eddies for his television work on an episode of Ben Casey (1961) and on the mini-series Guyana Tragedy: The Story of Jim Jones (1980). In 1996 he shared the American Cinema Editors Career Achievement Award with Desmond Marquette.

Selected filmography
 Terror Trail (1946)
 The Son of Rusty (1947)
 The Last Round-up (1947)
 Sport of Kings (1947)
Customs Agent (1950)
 Beauty on Parade (1950)
Gasoline Alley (1951)

References

External links 

 

1911 births
1996 deaths
Place of birth missing
American film editors